Here Comes Elmer is a 1943 American comedy film directed by Joseph Santley and written by Stanley Davis and Jack Townley. The film stars Al Pearce, Dale Evans, Frank Albertson, Gloria Stuart, Wally Vernon and Nick Cockrane. The film was released on November 15, 1943, by Republic Pictures.

Plot

Cast  
Al Pearce as Elmer Blurt / Al Pearce
Dale Evans as Jean Foster
Frank Albertson as Joe Maxwell
Gloria Stuart as Glenda Forbes
Wally Vernon as Wally
Nick Cockrane as Nick Cochrane 
Will Wright as Horace Parrot
Thurston Hall as P. J. Ellis
Ben Welden as Louis Burch
Chester Clute as Postelwaite
Luis Alberni as Dr. Zichy
Artie Auerbach as Kitzel

References

External links
 

1943 films
1940s English-language films
American comedy films
1943 comedy films
Republic Pictures films
Films directed by Joseph Santley
American black-and-white films
1940s American films